Gioux is a commune in the Creuse department in the Nouvelle-Aquitaine region in central France.

Geography
The commune is in the national park of the Millevaches (1000 lakes, not cows).

Population

Sights
The twelfth-century church.
A menhir known as the Pierre Point.
A Roman bridge on the way to Feniers.
Vestiges of a Roman villa at Maisonnières.

See also
Communes of the Creuse department

References

Communes of Creuse